Khote Sikkey is a 1998 Indian Hindi-language film directed by Partho Ghosh and produced by Krishan Oberoi. It stars Atul Agnihotri and Ayub Khan.

Plot 
Rohit (Atul Agnihotri) and Vijay (Ayub Khan) are two criminals who obtain money from truckers by impersonating police officers. This gets them into trouble, as they are placed in prison by Inspector Ajay Sinha. But with the help of another inmate, manage to escape, with the police right on their tail. The inmate is shot and killed, but before that he gives them the contact info for underworld Don, Pukhraj Mahadevan. The duo contact Pukhraj and team up with him to rob a bank. Ajay witnesses Pukhraj in the getaway car, and immediately arrests him. However, the wily Pukhraj not only manages to win a "not guilty" verdict in Court, but also manages to embarrass Ajay in the eyes of his superiors and the Courts. Ajay must now must come up with a fool-proof plan to arrest Pukhraj, but before he does that he must reign in Pukhraj's newest recruits - that is if they let him.

Cast

Atul Agnihotri
Ayub Khan
Madhoo
Krishan Oberoi
Kareena Grover
Anjali Jathar
Suresh Oberoi

Soundtrack
"Aankhon Se Aankhon Ki" - Hema Sardesai
"Dhak Dhak Dhadke Dil Yeh Mera" -  Udit Narayan, Alka Yagnik
"Jhilmil Sitaaron Ne Kaha" - Udit Narayan, Poornima
"Na Todoge Dil" - Kumar Sanu, Poornima
"Sahiba Kehde Haan" - Kumar Sanu, Alka Yagnik
"Sari Duniya Bole" - Kumar Sanu, Alka Yagnik

References

External links

1990s Hindi-language films
1998 films
Films scored by Rajesh Roshan
Indian action films
Films directed by Partho Ghosh
1998 action films